FWA (Favourite Website Awards) is an international award platform that honors and rewards web designers, developers and agencies around the world for excellence within the field of web design and development. The FWA was founded in May 2000 by Rob Ford.

In November 2012, The FWA was the most visited website award program in the history of the internet, with over 170 millions site visits.

Jury 
The FWA jury is composed of more than 500 web professionals (200 women + 200 men) from 35 countries.

Awards granted 

 FWA of the Day (FOTD) : Every day, the FWA jury selects the best project,
 FWA of the Month (FOTM): Every day, the FWA jury selects the best project,
 People's Choice Award (PCA) : Every year, a public vote selects the people's favourite project,
 FWA of the Year (FOTY) : Every year, the FWA jury selects the best project.

Hall Of Fame 
The FWA Hall of Fame was established in May 2007 (to celebrate the seventh anniversary of the FWA), as a recognition of web's greatest individuals and companies.

See also 

 Awwwards

References

External link 

 Official site
Web awards
Web development
Awards established in 2000